The Egyptian Camel Transport Corps (known as the CTC, Camel Corps or Camel Transport) were a group of Egyptian camel drivers who supported the British Army in Egypt during the First World War's Sinai and Palestine Campaign. The work done by the 170,000 men of the Corps helped British war operations in the Sinai desert and in Palestine and Syria by transporting supplies to the troops in extreme geographic and weather conditions.

Formation

Britain had occupied Egypt and controlled the Egyptian government after invading the country during the 19th century. At the beginning of the war, Britain set up the Protectorate of Egypt and imposed Martial Law, giving a solemn pledge to defend Egypt and not call on the Egyptian people to aid them in the conflict. However, the British quickly came to realise they desperately needed the support of Egyptian labour, camel drivers and their camels in a land that was so inhospitable to Europeans. The great value of this service was also acknowledged by General Allenby in his Despatch of 16 December 1917 where he mentions their steadiness under fire and devotion to duty.

Early in the conflict, volunteers for the Egyptian Camel Transport Corps, often from extremely poor villages, like those in the Egyptian Labour Corps were given a daily inducement of 7 Piastres (one shilling and six pence) and rations. Later it was necessary to utilize the already imposed British military authority over all Egyptian officials and civilians. Then the Muidir, Lord Lieutenant or Omdah, mayors of Egyptian towns, for a consideration organised press gangs and the necessary native armed guards to keep the forced labour at work. Members of the Egyptian Camel Transport Corps were 'sealed' by a seal attached to their wrists for periods that appear to have started as quite short term but became quite extended as the importance of their service was recognised.

Work

The members of the Egyptian Camel Transport Corps transported supplies to the fighting troops, from one end of the Sinai and Palestine Campaign to the other; from the desert of the Egyptian Sinai Peninsula to the northern Levant (now Syria). They saw service transporting supplies of all kinds across the flooded plain north of Gaza and Beersheba, up into the rocky inhospitable Judean Hills towards Jerusalem in late 1917, down the precipitous tracks to Jericho in the Jordan Valley, up into the even less hospitable hills of Moab towards Es Salt and Amman and also followed on the great victorious advance northwards in 1918, carrying ammunition, water and all types of stores for the men and horses of the fighting units at the front, and carried the wounded back.

Training of the camel corps had less to do with the Egyptian camel drivers who were often familiar with camel care and control, being mainly concerned with the problems the Australian and British officers and NCOs, who had transferred from the Army Service Corps and other AIF units, had in dealing with the animals. During this time, one or more of these men were regularly sent to hospitals with camel bites. Of the Australians, 49 were eventually commissioned and six became company commanders, so the Anzac and Imperial/Australian Mounted Divisions had a strong national component in their supporting camel transport.

In 1917 the Camel Transport Corps consisted of 35,000 camels, organized in 2,000 strong camel companies. They worked as Corps level transport, or in convoys, transporting supplies and stores from railhead to corps and divisions and to brigades, regiments and battalions suffering 9 per cent casualties during that year.

From December, 1915, to demobilization in 1919, some 72,500 camels were employed and 170,000 Egyptian drivers passed through the Corps. Of these 222 were killed in action and 1,458 were wounded while 4,010 died of disease, 78 went missing and 66 were taken prisoner.

Scope of Operations

During the Sinai Campaign, camels were used to carry the ambulance equipment of surgical instruments, splints, drugs, dressings, food, and tents, often marching independently of the rest of the ambulance; but despite their slow rate of marching, were rarely late arriving. Mobile columns attached to each light horse regiment, were established in June 1916 and attached to the ambulance section of these columns were 19 camels and drivers allocated for transporting water and equipment and an additional 44 camels and drivers.

They may have to travel as far as  accompanied by flies and camel smells and grunts.

Patrols
As all wheeled vehicles had been left at Kantara, nothing but sections of Camel Transport Corps accompanied all the patrols across Sinai as on Monday 29 May 1916, when a patrol by the New Zealand Mounted Rifle Brigade was accompanied by 850 camels carrying water, food and ammunition when they rode out from Etmaler.

The drivers and camels of the Egyptian Camel Transport Corps were also called on in the Sinai to transport aeroplanes. General Harry Chauvel describes how this was done:

Battle of Romani
On 21 July, the Egyptian Camel Transport Corps marched out for Romani with 2000 camels, 20 riding dromedaries, 12,000 natives, O.C., Adjutant, 5 Sectional OCs including McPherson, a number of NCOs and the usual attendant details – saddlers, ambulance, vets, batmen, orderlies etc. Ordered to march in mid summer during the  middle of the day the sand burnt and cracked the camel drivers' feet. Half didn't have a water bottle and they fainted with thirst, heat and weariness, falling out or plodding on blindly.

About 10,000 Egyptian Camel Transport Corps camels concentrated at Romani as well as innumerable troops prior to the attack. Until more camel transport was accumulated at Romani and Pelusium for the distribution of supplies and drinking water from railhead, the firepower of the main defences could only be increased by moving up the machine gun companies of 53 and 54 Divisions.

On the first day of battle, 4 August 1916 McPherson and his section of Egyptian Camel Transport Corps was attempting to deliver water to the Worcester Regiment of 5th Mounted Division, when they came under fire: 

McPherson and his section of Egyptian Camel Transport Corps was also involved the next day, in the pursuit on 5 August. At 10 AM his 200 camels moved out from Pelusium Station, this time to supply water to the 127th Brigade, composed of the Manchester regiments in the 42nd Division. However, before they arrived a tragedy was unfolding; McPherson 

Private Robert Bethel, also involved with transporting water and provisions to the fighting men, was serving in the Army Service Corps in support of the 42nd Division's 125th Brigade. He describes his involvement on 5 August 1916:

On 6 August, the eve of the Greater Bairam (celebrating the end of the Islamic year) the Egyptian Camel Transport Corps at Romani was ordered to move out at dawn to toil eastward. In the morning 150 men (most of whom were past the end of their contracts and entitled to be discharged) refused orders to fill their water bottles, draw their extra rations and saddle up. One man was hit about the head with the butt of a pistol and the dissenters were separated into small groups. They were divided up amongst three brigades of artillery, two field companies of engineers, the Glasgow Yeomanry, a Mobile Veterinary Section, a Machine Gun and Wire Line section; all units of the 52nd (Lowland) Infantry Division.

Advance to Bir el Abd
Ordered to follow the troops attempting to cut off the enemy retreat, McPherson describes the problems which developed among his section of the Egyptian Camel Transport Corps when the terms of employment were changed and resulting unrest was dealt with.

Bir el Abd
Bostock with the 3rd Light Horse Brigade Scouts near Bir el Abd, guided in the Egyptian Camel Transport Corps:   McPherson describes Bir el Abd:

Bir el Maghara Raid October 1916
Sections of the Camel Transport Corps took part in operations to Bir el Maghara in the interior of the Sinai Peninsula. The Column formed of 800 Australian Light Horse, 400 City of London Yeomanry, 600 Mounted Camelry and 4,500 Transport Camels, also 200 Camels for Army Medical Corps work moved out from Bayoud on 13 October 1916.

El Arish

The provision of water for the attacking force was the most difficult, but most vital element in the preparation for the attack on El Arish as from Mazar to El Arish there was no water and the Turkish defences at El Arish covered all the water in that area. So operations had to wait until the middle of December when the pipe–line had advanced sufficiently for water to be stored at Maadan (kilo. 128) and for the concentration of camels and drivers of the Egyptian Camel Transport Corps, large enough to carry the water forward in support the attack force. Preparations were not complete until 20 December, but in the meantime the enemy had abandoned the town.

Other campaigns
The CTC also participated in the First Transjordan attack on Amman (1918). Supplies of rations and forage were carried by the Egyptian Camel Transport Corps during the advance and retirement of Shea's, augmenting supplies carried by the troops and sent up to the troops fighting at Amman in March 1918 with the help of some pack-horses.

By 1 May 1918 during the Second Transjordan attack on Shunet Nimrin and Es Salt Allenby wrote to the British War Office regarding difficulties he was having in recruitment for the Egyptian Camel Transport Corps. "I have sent to you, today, an official letter – on the subject of enlistments for the Camel Transport Corps. We can't get the men, and we can't do without them; and I am advised that the only way to get them is compulsion – on the lines of the Corvée – but paid, of course, at the present rate of wages. As you know, I am opposed to compulsion; but we seem to be between the Devil and the Deep Sea, and I don’t know how to avoid it."

Notes

References

 
 
 
 
 
 
 
 
 
 
 
 
 
 
 

Middle Eastern theatre of World War I
British administrative corps
Military history of Egypt
Egypt in World War I
Camel cavalry
Military units and formations established in 1914
Military units and formations disestablished in 1919